William E. Herchman (March 10, 1933 – January 22, 2009) was an American football defensive tackle in the National Football League and American Football League. Herchman played for the San Francisco 49ers and Dallas Cowboys of the NFL, and the Houston Oilers of the AFL. His playing career ended prior to the merger of the two leagues in 1970. He played college football at Texas Technological College (now Texas Tech University).

Early years
Herchman attended Vernon High School before moving on to Tyler Junior College. After his sophomore year he transferred to Texas Technological College.

In 1997, he was inducted into the Tyler Junior College Circle of Honor.

Professional career

San Francisco 49ers
Herchman was selected by the San Francisco 49ers in the third round (26th overall) of the 1956 NFL Draft. In 1957, he returned a 54-yard interception for a touchdown against the Chicago Bears.

He started every game for four seasons at right defensive tackle. On June 30, 1960, he was traded to the Dallas Cowboys in exchange for a fourth round draft choice (#46-Charlie Sieminski) .

Dallas Cowboys
In 1960, Herchman was a part of the Dallas Cowboys inaugural season and was a backup to Ed Husmann at defensive tackle. He registered 51 tackles and had one fumble recovery.

The next year, he was named the starter at right defensive tackle. He was released on September 11, 1962.

Houston Oilers
In the 1962, Herchman played 12 games for the Houston Oilers of the American Football League.

Personal life
Herchman married Janis Lee Hargrove and they had four children, Randy, Terry, Kathy and Missy. He worked in concrete sales for 42 years.

References

External links

 

1933 births
2009 deaths
People from Vernon, Texas
Players of American football from Texas
American football defensive tackles
Tyler Apaches football players
Texas Tech Red Raiders football players
San Francisco 49ers players
Dallas Cowboys players
Houston Oilers players
American Football League players